was a Japanese nihonga painter. Her maiden name was  Yuki Mizoguchi. She was known for her bijinga.

Biography 
Ogura was born in Ōtsu city, Shiga Prefecture and graduated from the Nara Women's Normal School (the predecessor of Nara Women's University). She was employed as a school teacher, but her interest in art led her to study under noted Nihonga painter Yukihiko Yasuda in 1920.

In 1926, her painting Kyuri ("Cucumbers") was selected for an Inten Exhibition by the Japan Fine Arts Academy (Nihon Bijutsu-in) . Ogura became the first female member of the Japan Fine Arts Academy in 1932. She specialized in graceful family scenes, still life, and pictures of women. During the 1950s and 1960s, she painted many large portraits of friends and family members in the nude. Although Ogura never departed from the traditional framework of the Nihonga style, her figure paintings are often described by contemporary critics as "modern," both in style and content.

A very prolific artist, in 1976, she was selected to become a member of the Japan Art Academy (Nihon Geijitsu-in), and later become honorary chairperson of that organization. She was awarded the Order of Culture in 1980, and is one of only two women painters (the other being fellow Nihonga painter Uemura Shōen) to be so honored.

Her studio and home were located in Kamakura, where she lived to the age of 105.

Famous works 
Yuami Onna ("Bathing Women", 1938)
Oyako ("Mother and Child", 1961)
Maiko ("Apprentice Geisha", 1962)

References 
 Conant, Ellen P., Rimer, J. Thomas, Owyoung, Stephen. Nihonga: Transcending the Past : Japanese-Style Painting, 1868–1968. Weatherhill (1996). 
 Mason, Penelope. History of Japanese Art. Prentice Hall (2004). 
 Ogura, Yuki. Ogura Yuki. Kodansha America (1988). 

1895 births
2000 deaths
Japanese centenarians
Nihonga painters
Buddhist artists
People from Ōtsu, Shiga
Recipients of the Order of Culture
20th-century Japanese painters
20th-century Japanese women artists
Women centenarians
Artists from Shiga Prefecture
Japanese women painters
Nara Women's University alumni